Ludvig Larsen Kragtorp (14 November 1862 – ?) was a Norwegian physician and politician for the Liberal Party.

He was elected to the Norwegian Parliament in 1907 from the constituency Eidsberg, and was re-elected in 1910 and 1913.

Born in Rødenes, he enrolled as a student in 1884 and graduated as Candidate of Medicine in 1892. He first opened his own physician's office in Høland in 1893, but then worked as municipal physician in Spydeberg from 1893 to 1912. He was the mayor of Spydeberg from 1904 to 1907, having been a member of the municipal council. He also chaired the school board from 1899 to 1903.

References

1862 births
Year of death missing
Members of the Storting
Liberal Party (Norway) politicians
Mayors of places in Østfold
Norwegian municipal physicians
People from Marker, Norway